Torynesis is a genus of butterflies from the subfamily Satyrinae in the family Nymphalidae. It comprises five species from South Africa and
Lesotho. It is one of the genera in the tribe Dirini Verity, 1953; other genera of this tribe that are found in the Afrotropical Region are Paralethe, Aeropetes, Tarsocera, Dira, Serradinga and Dingana.

Species
Torynesis hawequas Dickson, 1973
Torynesis magna (van Son, 1941)
Torynesis mintha (Geyer, [1837])
Torynesis orangica Vári, 1971
Torynesis pringlei Dickson, 1979

References

External links 

 "Torynesis Butler, [1899]" at Markku Savela's Lepidoptera and Some Other Life Forms

Satyrini
Butterfly genera
Taxa named by Arthur Gardiner Butler